In molecular biology, glycoside hydrolase family 89 is a family of glycoside hydrolases.

Glycoside hydrolases  are a widespread group of enzymes that hydrolyse the glycosidic bond between two or more carbohydrates, or between a carbohydrate and a non-carbohydrate moiety. A classification system for glycoside hydrolases, based on sequence similarity, has led to the definition of >100 different families. This classification is available on the CAZy web site, and also discussed at CAZypedia, an online encyclopedia of carbohydrate active enzymes.

Glycoside hydrolase family 89 CAZY GH_89 includes enzymes with α-N-acetylglucosaminidase  activity. The enzyme consist of three structural domains, the N-terminal domain has an alpha-beta fold, the central domain has a TIM barrel fold, and the C-terminal domain has an all alpha helical fold.

Alpha-N-acetylglucosaminidase is a lysosomal enzyme required for the stepwise degradation of heparan sulphate. Mutations on the alpha-N-acetylglucosaminidase (NAGLU) gene can lead to Mucopolysaccharidosis type IIIB (MPS IIIB; or Sanfilippo syndrome type B) characterised by neurological dysfunction but relatively mild somatic manifestations.

References

EC 3.2.1
GH family
Protein families